The Winona-Montgomery Consolidated School District (WMCSD), formerly the Winona Separate School District, is a public school district based in Winona, Mississippi, United States. It currently serves all of Montgomery County.

Effective July 1, 2018 the Winona and Montgomery County School District were consolidated into the Winona-Montgomery Consolidated School District. The consolidation was mandated by the Mississippi state government. In 2018 the Montgomery School District attempted to get a restraining order to stop the consolidation. The current district was formed in 2018.

The Winona Separate School District served almost all of Winona and some unincorporated areas to the southwest.

Schools
Winona Secondary School 
Winona Elementary School

Demographics

2007-08 school year
There were a total of 1,303 students enrolled in the Winona Separate School District during the 2007–2008 school year. The makeup of the district was 47% female and 53% male. The racial makeup of the district was 53.95% African American, 45.28% White, 0.31% Hispanic, and 0.46% Asian.

Previous school years

Accountability statistics

See also
List of school districts in Mississippi

References

External links
Winona-Montgomery Consolidated School District

Map of Montgomery County, MS school districts, 2010 - U.S. Census Bureau

Education in Montgomery County, Mississippi
School districts in Mississippi
School districts established in 2018